Tinana is a rural town and locality in the Fraser Coast Region, Queensland, Australia. In the  the locality of Tinana had a population of 5,476 people.

Geography 
Tinana is on the south-western bank of the Mary River, opposite the town of Maryborough. Although originally  a separate town, the construction of the Lamington Bridge over the Mary River has effectively made Tinana a suburb of Maryborough. Mary River forms the western and north-eastern boundaries, and Jumpo Creek is the eastern boundary. The Bruce Highway passes through from south to north, and Gympie Road (State Route 57) diverges to the north-east.

History
The name Tinana is derived from the name of the creek, which in turn was named in 1852 by surveyor William Labatt. The name is believed to be in honour of Ihikiera Te Tinana, a Māori  chief who was known to the botanist John Carne Bidwill from his time in New Zealand in 1840-41.

Tinana Creek Provisional School opened on 1 January 1871, closed in 1873, reopened in 1874  and closed permanently in 1878.

Tinana State School opened on 31 May 1875.

Holy Trinity Anglican church opened circa 1883. It closed circa 1918.

Tinana Congregational Church opened on Sunday 30 August 1908. In January 1932, the Congregational Home Missionary Society asked the Fort Street Baptist Church in Maryborough to assume responsibility for the Sunday evening services at Tinana, leading to the Baptist Church taking over the control and supervision of the Congregation Church. In 1937 the Baptist Church formally purchased the church. It was on a  site on the southern corner of Teddington Road and Gympie Road. It is no longer extant.

In the 2011 census, Tinana had a population of 4,877people.

On 25 April (Anzac Day) 2015, as part of the World War I centenary, a war memorial was officially unveiled at the school. It commemorates former students who served in World War I.

In the  the locality of Tinana had a population of 5,476 people.

Heritage listings
Tinana has a number of heritage-listed sites, including:
 Pacific Islander Hospital and Cemetery site: corner of Bluebell Road East and Gernich Road
 Commissioner Bidwill's Grave: Cran Road

Education 

Tinana State School is a government primary (Prep-6) school for boys and girls at 239 Gympie Road.  In 2015, it had an enrolment of 509 students with 38 teachers (33 full-time equivalent). In 2018, the school had an enrolment of 498 students with 41 teachers (34 full-time equivalent) and 28 non-teaching staff (19 full-time equivalent). It includes a special education program.

Amenities 
The Tinana branch of the Queensland Country Women's Association meets at the CWA hall at 56 Gympie Road.

There are a number of parks in the locality, including:

 Fauna Reserve
 Jack Mason Park

 Leslie Drive Park

 O'Connor Road Park

 Pioneer Country Park

 Schultz Park

 Woocoo Park

Notable residents 
Notable residents of Tinana include:
 John Carne Bidwill, botanist

References

External links

 
 

 
Maryborough, Queensland
Fraser Coast Region
Towns in Queensland
Localities in Queensland